Tonya LaRay Edwards (born March 13, 1968) is an American retired professional basketball player born in Flint, Michigan, currently an assistant coach of the Chicago Sky in the WNBA. She was previously head coach of the Alcorn State Lady Braves basketball team.

Professional career 
After graduating from college, there were no opportunities to play professional basketball in the U.S., so Edwards played professionally in Spain from 1991 to '92, Turkey in 1994, and Israel from 1995 to '96. In the Autumn of 1996, she played for the Columbus Quest in the American Basketball League (ABL), and won two championship titles with them. In 1998, Edwards became the interim head coach for the Quest after coach Brian Agler resigned. After the ABL folded due to financial difficulties, Edwards was selected by the Minnesota Lynx in the 1999 WNBA draft. She also played for the Phoenix Mercury and Charlotte Sting.

Edwards began her coaching career by returning to her alma mater, Northwestern Community High School in Flint, Michigan, for five seasons (1990–1995). She guided her team to the 1993 state championship with perfect 28–0 record, a 1992 state champion runner-up finish, and compiled a 78-23 overall record (.772).  She was named 1993 "High School Coach of the Year" in the state of Michigan.

In 2004, she became a radio commentator for the Phoenix Mercury games, and later became an assistant coach in the National Women's Basketball League.

In 2006, she was inducted to the Greater Flint Afro-American Hall of Fame.  That same year, she was named as an assistant coach to the women's basketball team at University of Detroit Mercy.

After two years at Detroit, Edwards was head coach at Alcorn State from 2008 to 2015. Edwards was SWAC Coach of the Year in 2011 and led Alcorn State to the SWAC Championship Game in 2012. In seven seasons, Edwards went 60–147 at Alcorn State. On March 23, 2015, Alcorn State announced it would not extend Edwards' contract, which would expire at the end of the month.

WNBA career statistics

Regular season

|-
| align="left" | 1999
| align="left" | Minnesota
| 32 || 32 || 32.2 || .357 || .344 || .806 || 3.5 || 2.6 || 0.8 || 0.4 || 2.1 || 14.8
|-
| align="left" | 2000
| align="left" | Phoenix
| 32 || 32 || 28.9 || .376 || .307 || .782 || 2.4 || 1.8 || 1.1 || 0.3 || 2.0 || 10.6
|-
| align="left" | 2001
| align="left" | Phoenix
| 10 || 9 || 20.8 || .366 || .357 || .787 || 1.9 || 1.8 || 0.5 || 0.1 || 2.2 || 9.4
|-
| align="left" | 2001
| align="left" | Charlotte
| 22 || 0 || 16.9 || .340 || .227 || .730 || 2.0 || 1.4 || 0.6 || 0.3 || 1.8 || 4.5
|-
| align="left" | 2002
| align="left" | Charlotte
| 29 || 0 || 10.4 || .364 || .280 || .717 || 1.4 || 0.8 || 0.6 || 0.1 || 0.6 || 3.9
|-
| align="left" | Career
| align="left" | 4 years, 3 teams
| 125 || 73 || 22.7 || .362 || .322 || .775 || 2.3 || 1.7 || 0.8 || 0.2 || 1.7 || 9.0

Playoffs

|-
| align="left" | 2000
| align="left" | Phoenix
| 2 || 2 || 30.5 || .250 || .231 || .667 || 3.0 || 2.5 || 2.0 || 0.0 || 1.0 || 8.5
|-
| align="left" | 2001
| align="left" | Charlotte
| 8 || 0 || 14.9 || .429 || .500 || 1.000 || 2.0 || 1.5 || 0.6 || 0.0 || 1.4 || 2.8
|-
| align="left" | 2002
| align="left" | Charlotte
| 2 || 0 || 9.5 || .200 || .333 || .000 || 0.5 || 0.5 || 0.0 || 0.0 || 0.5 || 1.5
|-
| align="left" | Career
| align="left" | 3 years, 2 teams
| 12 || 2 || 16.6 || .326 || .300 || .600 || 1.9 || 1.5 || 0.8 || 0.0 || 1.2 || 3.5

USA Basketball
Edwards was named to the team representing the US at the 1987 William Jones Cup competition in Taipei, Taiwan. The team won all seven games to win the gold medal for the event. The USA was down at halftime in the opening game against Japan, but came back in the second half to win, helped by 15 points from Campbell. Edwards was the second leading scorer on the team, averaging 12.4 points per game over the seven games. She was one of three players from the USA team to be named to the Jones Cup All-Tournament Team.

In the following year, 1988, Edwards was also named to the Jones Cup team. The USA team was not as successful, with a 3–2 record, but that was enough to secure the silver medal. Edwards was the leading scorer on the team, averaging 15.4 points per game, and tied for the team lead in steals with 15.

Head coaching record
Source:

References

Sources
WNBA Player Profile
September 11, 2006 press release on Edwards joining the University of Detroit Mercy coaching staff
Profile from the Greater Flint Afro-American Hall of Fame

1968 births
Living people
Basketball players from Flint, Michigan
American women's basketball coaches
American women's basketball players
American expatriate basketball people in Israel
American expatriate basketball people in Spain
American expatriate basketball people in Turkey
Alcorn State Lady Braves basketball coaches
Charlotte Sting players
Columbus Quest players
Detroit Mercy Titans women's basketball coaches
Fenerbahçe women's basketball players
Los Angeles Sparks coaches
Minnesota Lynx draft picks
Minnesota Lynx players
Phoenix Mercury players
Shooting guards
Tennessee Lady Volunteers basketball players
Women's National Basketball Association All-Stars